Yeğenli may refer to the following places in Turkey:

 Yeğenli, Bartın, a village in the district of Bartın, Bartın Province
 Yeğenli, Silifke, a village in the district of Silifke, Mersin Province